Tatyana Vladimirovna Moskvina (2 November 1958 – 25 July 2022) was a Russian columnist, novelist, actress, radio and television journalist, and host, and leading theatre and film critic.

She was born in 1958 in Leningrad. In 1981, she graduated from the faculty of theatre criticism at Leningrad State Institute of Theatre and Cinematography.

Tatyana Moskvina contributed to many cinema and literary journals, including Russian Encyclopedia of Modern Cinema (1986–2000). In 2000, 2003 she was awarded the title of The Golden Quill in Journalism in Saint-Petersburg. In 2005, her novel  Death is All Men  was short-listed for the Russian award  National Bestseller.

References

External links
Biography in the Russian Cinema Magazine Seans in Russian
an article by Tatyana Moskvina in Novaya Gazeta

Amazon.com profile
Review in the Moscow Times
Columns and essays in english translation in the magazine Pulse (Saint-Petersburg, Russia)
The full text of the novel She knew something

1958 births
2022 deaths
Writers from Saint Petersburg
Russian women writers
Russian State Institute of Performing Arts alumni